Standoff commonly refers to:
Impasse, two sides negotiating an agreement are unable to reach an agreement and become deadlocked
Stalemate, a situation in the game of chess where the player whose turn it is to move is not in check but has no legal move
Mexican standoff, a confrontation amongst three or more parties in which neither party can proceed nor retreat without being exposed to danger
Police standoff, where the building with criminals is surrounded by police

Standoff or stand-off may also refer to:

Media production 
Standoff (TV series), a 2006–2007 Fox Broadcasting television series
Stand Off, a 2012 film written and directed by Terry George (known as Whole Lotta Sole in Europe)
American Standoff, a 2002 American documentary about a strike
Standoff (film), a 2016 film
Standoff (Homeland), an episode of the television series Homeland

Weaponry 
Standoff missile, a type of missile or bomb released at a safe distance from the target which travels autonomously to the target
AGM-154 Joint Standoff Weapon, the product of a joint venture between the United States Navy and Air Force
Standoff Land Attack Missile

Sports 
Stand-off (rugby league), an English alternative name for five-eighth, one of the rugby league positions
Stand-off, an alternative name for fly-half, one of the rugby union positions

Other uses 
Standoff (separator), used in mechanics and electronics to separate two parts from one another
Standoff distance, a certain safe distance from a hazard or objective (live bomb, fire, artillery aimpoint, etc.), defined by a standard operating procedure
Stand Off, Alberta, Canada, unincorporated community
Standoff (draw)
Standoff (video game), a video game formerly known as Active Shooter
Shootout, a fight between armed combatants using firearms